The following article presents a summary of the 2008 football (soccer) season in Brazil, which was the 107th season of competitive football in the country.

Campeonato Brasileiro Série A

The Campeonato Brasileiro Série A 2008 began on May 10, 2008, and concluded on December 7, 2008.

São Paulo declared as the Campeonato Brasileiro champions.

Relegation
The four worst placed teams, which are Figueirense, Vasco da Gama, Portuguesa and Ipatinga, were relegated to the following year's second level.

Campeonato Brasileiro Série B

The Campeonato Brasileiro Série B 2008 began on May 9, 2008, and concluded on November 29, 2008.

Corinthians declared as the Campeonato Brasileiro Série B champions.

Promotion
The four best placed teams, which are Corinthians, Santo André, Avaí and Barueri, were promoted to the following year's first level.

Relegation
The four worst placed teams, which are Marília, Criciúma, Gama and CRB, were relegated to the following year's third level.

Campeonato Brasileiro Série C

The Campeonato Brasileiro Série C 2008 began on July 6, 2008, and concluded on November 23, 2008.

Atlético Goianiense declared as the Campeonato Brasileiro Série C champions.

Promotion
The four best placed teams in the final stage of the competition, which are Atlético Goianiense, Guarani, Campinense and Duque de Caxias, were promoted to the following year's second level.

Copa do Brasil

The Copa do Brasil 2008 began on February 14, 2008, and ended on June 11, 2008. The Copa do Brasil final was played between Corinthians and Sport.

Sport won on away goals after 3-3 in aggregate score.

State championship champions

Youth competition champions

(1) The Copa Nacional do Espírito Santo Sub-17, between 2008 and 2012, was named Copa Brasil Sub-17. The similar named Copa do Brasil Sub-17 is organized by the Brazilian Football Confederation and it was first played in 2013.

Other competition champions

Brazilian clubs in international competitions

Brazil national team
The following table lists all the games played by the Brazil national football team in official competitions and friendly matches during 2008.

TBD = to be decided

Women's football

Brazil women's national football team
The following table lists all the games played by the Brazil women's national football team in official competitions and friendly matches during 2008.

The Brazil women's national football team competed in the following competitions in 2008:

Copa do Brasil de Futebol Feminino

The Copa do Brasil de Futebol Feminino 2008 began on November 1, 2008, and concluded on December 17, 2008. The Copa do Brasil de Futebol Feminino final was played between Santos and Sport.

Santos declared as the cup champions by aggregate score of 6–1.

Other domestic competition champions

References

 Brazilian competitions at RSSSF
 2008 Brazil national team matches at RSSSF
 2008-2009 Brazil women's national team matches at RSSSF

 
Seasons in Brazilian football
Brazil